Music Inspired by The Chronicles of Narnia: The Lion, the Witch, and the Wardrobe is a collection of songs by various Christian artists with the common theme of the book series The Chronicles of Narnia by C. S. Lewis. The album was released in anticipation of the December 9, 2005 premiere of the film The Chronicles of Narnia: The Lion, the Witch and the Wardrobe. By October 2005, the songs "Remembering You" by Steven Curtis Chapman and "Waiting for the World to Fall" by Jars of Clay were already being played on Contemporary Christian radio.

Relient K, Mae, and the Newsboys wrote songs ("In Like a Lion (Always Winter)" for Relient K, "Where the Falls Begin" for Mae, and "Something to Believe In" for the Newsboys) to be considered to be included on the album. When they were not asked to be on the album, the bands released the songs on their Apathetic EP, The Everglow Special Edition, and Go: Special Edition, respectively. Relient K also re-released their Narnia song on their Christmas album, Let it Snow, Baby... Let it Reindeer.

Track listing

Notes 
 All songs are exclusive to this album except Delirious?'s track, which is available on their 2005 release The Mission Bell. An acoustic version of "Hero" appears on Bethany Dillon's album So Far: The Acoustic Sessions.

Sheet music 
A book of sheet music was published by Hal Leonard Corporation on January 1, 2006 featuring piano arrangements, guitar chords, and lyrics to the songs featured on this album.

Charts

Awards 
The compilation won an award at the Dove Awards at the 37th Annual Gospel Music Awards for Special Event Album of the Year. All contributing artists and producers received an award for their contribution.

References

External links 
 The Chronicles of Narnia: The Lion, the Witch and the Wardrobe

Christian rock albums
The Chronicles of Narnia music
2005 soundtrack albums
Fantasy film soundtracks